"Carly's Song" is a 1993 song created by the musical project Enigma.  Released as a single in Australia, it peaked at number 91 on the ARIA singles chart in November 1993, spending one week in the top 100.

Overview
The song is featured on the soundtrack of the 1993 movie Sliver. The song uses samples from the Mongolian traditional long song, "Tosonguyn Oroygoor", sung by Dechinzundui Nadmid. This song is also featured in the Tamil film "Baasha" (1995) as villain Mark Antony's (Raghuvaran) intro bgm.

It is rumored that Sharon Stone received a portion of the soundtrack profit, so she agreed to appear in the music video for this song .  This song was later remixed and re-released as "Age of Loneliness" on Enigma's second studio album, The Cross of Changes.

Critical reception
Larry Flick from Billboard wrote, "Act that left many panting with "Sadeness" returns with hypnotic down-tempo gem, layered with an insinuating, shuffling hip-hop beat, and primal female chanting. Track gets its movement and color from a subtle use of African percussion and unusual keyboard effects. Requisite heavy breathing adds to its sensual ambience." He added, "Don't miss the heavily bewigged Sharon Stone in the videoclip!"

Track listing
 "Carly's Song" – 3:47
 "Carly's Song" (Jam & Spoon Remix) – 6:31
 "Carly's Loneliness" – 3:11
 "Carly's Song" (Instrumental) – 4:00

Charts

References

1993 singles
1993 songs
Enigma (German band) songs
Songs written by Michael Cretu
Songs written for films
Virgin Records singles